Sconce may refer to:

Sconce (fortification), a military fortification
Sconce (light fixture)
Sconcing, imposing a penalty in the form of drink
Sconce Point on the Isle of Wight, England

People with the surname
Jeffrey Sconce, professor of media 
Jerry Sconce, American football coach and criminal 
Mark Sconce (born 1968), Welsh footballer